Clifford Monroe (Cliff) Markle (May 3, 1894 – May 24, 1974), was a Major League Baseball pitcher who played with the New York Yankees and the Cincinnati Reds. He batted and threw right-handed.

He was born in Dravosburg, Pennsylvania and died in Temple City, California.

External links

1894 births
1974 deaths
Major League Baseball pitchers
Baseball players from Pennsylvania
New York Yankees players
Cincinnati Reds players
Cleveland Counts players
Morristown Jobbers players
Galveston Pirates players
Norfolk Tars players
Waco Navigators players
Toronto Maple Leafs (International League) players
Salt Lake City Bees players
Atlanta Crackers players
St. Paul Saints (AA) players
Dallas Steers players
Omaha Crickets players